Jesse Lyman Hurlbut (1843–1930) was an American clergyman of the Methodist Episcopal Church. He was born in New York City, graduated at Wesleyan University in 1864, and held pastorates at Newark, Montclair, Paterson, Plainfield, Hoboken, Morristown, Orange, and Bloomfield, all in New Jersey. After 1879 he was connected with the Sunday-school and tract work of his denomination. He was secretary of the Epworth League in 1889–1892 and for some time was associated with J. H. Vincent in the direction of the Chautauqua Literary and Scientific Circle. From 1909 until his retirement in 1914 he was District Superintendent of the Newark District.

Among his works are: 
Manual of Biblical Geography (1882)
Outlines in Old Testament History (1890)
Our Church (1902)
Story of the Bible (1905)
Outline Studies in the New Testament (1906)
Teacher Training Lessons (1908)
Organizing and Building up the Sunday School (1909)
Traveling in the Holy Land through the Stereoscope (1913)
The Superintendent's Helper (1915)
Life of Christ for Young and Old (1915)
The Story of Chautauqua (1921)
An Introduction to the John C. Winston Company's 1909 edition of John Bunyan's Pilgrim's Progress - a version revised for younger readers.

References

External links
 
 
 

Chautauqua Institution
Wesleyan University alumni
Religious leaders from New York City
Clergy from Newark, New Jersey
American Methodist clergy
19th-century Methodist ministers
20th-century Methodist ministers
American theologians
Methodist theologians
1843 births
1930 deaths